The Medal of Bravery may refer to: 

 Medal of Bravery (Canada)
 Medal of Bravery (Hungary)
 List of medals for bravery